Trombidium semilunare is a species of mite in the genus Trombidium in the family Trombidiidae. It is found in Romania.

References
 Synopsis of the described Arachnida of the World: Trombidiidae

Trombidiidae
Endemic fauna of Romania
Animals described in 1955